Windjammers 2 is a 2022 sports video game developed and published by Dotemu. It is the sequel to the 1994 Neo Geo game Windjammers, co-produced by Data East and SNK. Windjammers 2 was released for Nintendo Switch, PlayStation 4, Stadia, Windows, and Xbox One on January 20, 2022. It received generally positive reviews from critics, who praised the visuals, new content and gameplay mechanics.

Gameplay

Windjammers 2 is a sports game played from a top-down perspective, in which players must try to throw a frisbee into their opponent's goal while protecting their own. Players can earn 3 or 5 points by landing the frisbee into their opponent's goal in the yellow or red zones respectively, or can try to land the frisbee on the floor of their opponent's side to earn 2 points. Players win a set by achieving a certain number points, and win the match by winning the most sets.  In the game, players select from 11 playable characters, including all six returning characters from the original Windjammers and one secret character. Each character has their own attributes. For instance, some characters have more steady control than others at the cost of speed. There are EX Moves, which are special powers can be that activated for gameplay advantages. Players can compete on 10 different courts, including all six courts from Windjammers, which feature different goal zones and gameplay properties. Both single-player and local multiplayer modes are featured. The game includes an "Arcade Mode", where multiple matches are played through championships. Windjammers 2 features cross-platform play between Windows and Xbox One versions.

Development
Dotemu, the game's developer and publisher, approached Paon DP, the intellectual property owner for Windjammers, a chance to develop a port to the original game and develop a brand new game in the series. In order to be faithful to the original game, Kevin Delbrayelle, who had retro-engineered the first game's program codes during the production of its port, returned to lead the sequel's technical development. Similar to Wonder Boy: The Dragon's Trap and Streets of Rage 4, the game features hand-drawn 2D animation visuals. The game's pre-production started in late 2017 and the title was officially announced during a Nintendo Direct held in August 2018. 

The game was planned for a 2019 release on Nintendo Switch and Windows,  but got delayed to early 2020. In December 2020, Dotemu confirmed that the game was delayed again to 2021. Over the course of its development, versions for PlayStation 4, Stadia, and Xbox One were also added. The game was released on January 20, 2022. A version for Amazon Luna was made available on November 4, 2022.

Reception 

Windjammers 2 received "generally favorable" reviews from critics for most platforms, according to review aggregator Metacritic; the PlayStation 4 version received "mixed or average" reviews.

Eurogamer gave the title a positive review, praising how faithful the gameplay was to the original, "Indeed, this is a more conservative thing than Streets of Rage 4, in part by necessity - the fundamentals are precisely the same, and beneath the glossy new visuals the movement of each character and the arc of the discus exactly the same on an old Astro City as they are playing on an OLED Switch". Nintendo Life liked the new visuals, saying that they were a "match for the artistic overhaul we saw in Streets of Rage 4". TouchArcade disliked the introduction of the game's mechanic, stating, "Newcomers are going to have to be patient as they learn the ropes, because the game frankly does a miserable job of teaching its mechanics. There’s no training mode, and the CPU opponent is quite aggressive for a beginner even on easy difficulty". IGN appreciated how every move had a "logical counter" to it, with the reviewer saying, "I never felt like I was the victim of unfair tactics or an exploit of some kind".

PCMag liked how the different playstyles of each character led to interesting match-ups, giving an example of "Do you counter Brazil's super-speedster, J. Raposa, with another swift-footed character, or do you go with a powerhouse like Germany's musclebound K. Wessel?". Destructoid praised the hand-drawn 2D art, but criticized the control scheme, writing, "My issue with playing Windjammers 2 was that the throw button is also the dash button, and you’re almost always dashing to intercept the saucer. Asking me to take my finger off the dash button was a tricky proposition since I felt like my momentum was best maintained with just the throw and lob". Game Informer praised the game's controls, depth, presentation, and soundtrack, but heavily criticized the lack of substantial content beyond the main portion of the game and the lack of a good in-game tutorial. GameSpot praised the fun gameplay, increased depth, and online play while criticizing the lack of accessibility and low amount of content on offer. PC Gamer found the characters and pacing to be appealing but criticized the game's punishing difficulty. Shacknews similarly lauded the mix new and returning content, smooth gameplay, visual style, soundtrack, netcode, options, and performance, while taking issue with the arcade difficulty, lack of balancing, and lack of accessibility.

References

External links
 

2022 video games
Fantasy sports video games
Stadia games
PlayStation 4 games
Video games developed in France
Multiplayer and single-player video games
Nintendo Switch games
Video game sequels
Pong variations
Windows games
Xbox Cloud Gaming games
Xbox One games
Xbox Play Anywhere games
Video games scored by Harumi Fujita